Souk El Beransia is one of the souks of the medina of Tunis.

Location 
The souk is located in the west of Al-Zaytuna Mosque, near souk El Berka.

Products 
It is specialized in selling Burnus, a long traditional wool coat with Berber origins.

Notes and references 

Beransia